Stomolophus is a genus of true jellyfish from the West Atlantic and Pacific. It is the only genus in the monotypic family Stomolophidae. Formerly, Nomura's jellyfish (Nemopilema nomurai) was also included in this genus, but has now been reclassified to the family Rhizostomatidae.

Species
According to the World Register of Marine Species, Stomolophus includes two species:

Stomolophus fritillarius
Stomolophus meleagris - the cannonball or cabbagehead jellyfish

References

 
Daktyliophorae
Scyphozoan genera